Most Happy Fella (1967–1983) was a bay Standardbred horse by Meadow Skipper. He was voted Pacer of the Year in the United States in 1970 when he won the Triple Crown of Harness Racing for Pacers.

Racing career
As a two-year-old in 1969, Most Happy Fella won several stakes races, including the American-National at Sportsman’s Park

As a three-year-old, Most Happy Fella won the Triple Crown of Harness Racing for Pacers of the Cane Pace, Little Brown Jug and Messenger Stakes. He also won  the Adios Pace beating Columbia George in a race-off and the Shapiro Stakes at Hollywood Park At his last race start he finished second behind Laverne Hanover in the American Classic against older pacers.

Stud record
At stud he sired Cam Fella the 1982 and 1983 Harness Horse of the Year and many pacers now trace back to him in their pedigree through, in addition to Cam Fella, his son Oil Burner who sired No Nukes who in turn sired Western Hanover. Jate Lobell, Rocknroll Hanover, Western Ideal and The Panderosa are all sires tracing back to him through his sons. Most Happy Fella was also the sire of $1m earner Troublemaker and notable mares Silk Stockings and Tarport Hap.

Most Happy Fella died in December 1983 aged 16 at Blue Chip Farm where he had stood for his whole stud career. His sons and daughters had earned $55 million at the time of his death which made him the all-time leading sire regardless of breed.

References

1967 racehorse births
1983 racehorse deaths
American Standardbred racehorses
Harness racing in the United States
Little Brown Jug winners
Cane Pace winners
Messenger Stakes winners
Triple Crown of Harness Racing winners
United States Harness Racing Hall of Fame inductees